Moya is a town and a municipality in the northern part of the island of Gran Canaria in the Province of Las Palmas in the Canary Islands. Its population is 7,977 (2013), and the area is 31.87 km².

The town Moya is situated in the mountains, 4 km from the coast and 15 km west of Las Palmas. The GC-2 motorway passes through the northern part of the municipality.

Historical population

History and information
The northern part of Gran Canaria was covered in forests during the Spanish conquest of the 15th century. All that's left today are two redoubts, the Finca de Osorio in Teror and the Tilos de Moya. Here, the native chief, Doramas, took refuge after attacking the Castilian conquerors, giving the name Selva de Doramas or "Doramas' Wood". These days, there are old caserios (country-houses) between hills and cliffs with its medicinal waters. The town area is surrounded by huge volcanic valleys and is well known for its Neo-Romanesque church. This impressive structure dates back to the first half of the 20th century. Moya is the birthplace of the Spanish poet Tomás Morales Castellano.

See also
List of municipalities in Las Palmas

References

External links
 Moya page Gran Canaria site

Municipalities in Gran Canaria